The Baghdad Conservatory is a music conservatory in Baghdad, Iraq . Hanna Petros founded the institution in 1936.

The conservatory has produced such famous oud players as Munir Bashir and Jamil Bashir, Salman Shukur and Ghanim Haddad. The maqam singer Farida Mohammad Ali had taught there.  Also, instrumentalists Munir Bashir and Salem Abdul Karem.

See also
Music of Iraq

External links
Instruments at the Baghdad Conservatory

References 

Music schools in Iraq